The Chengde South railway station is a railway station of Jingshen Passenger Railway that located in People's Republic of China.

Railway stations in Hebei
Stations on the Beijing–Harbin High-Speed Railway
Railway stations in China opened in 2018